Avian Tower is a high-rise building located in Surabaya, Indonesia. It serves as the headquarters of Avian Brands

The Tower is 84 meters tall, with 20 stories. The tower is a twisted tower, the floor rotates an average 3°, and the tower itself rotate 60°.

Facilities
The lower floor of the tower is used as a podium and a car park. The podium contains retail outlets, banks, and clubs.

See also
List of twisted buildings
List of tallest buildings in Surabaya

References

Buildings and structures in Surabaya
Skyscrapers in Surabaya
Twisted buildings and structures